Lawrence H. Stice (July 6, 1905–September 21, 1973) was an American businessman and politician.

Stice was born in Warren County, Illinois. He lived with his wife and family in Monmouth, Illinois. Stice served as the real estate department manager for the Illinois Bankers Assurance Company. He served in the Illinois House of Representatives in 1935 and 1936. Stice was a Democrat. He died in Hot Springs, Arkansas. Stice had lived in Roseville, Illinois.

Notes

External links

1905 births
1973 deaths
People from Monmouth, Illinois
Businesspeople from Illinois
Democratic Party members of the Illinois House of Representatives
20th-century American politicians
20th-century American businesspeople